This is a partial list of alcohol poisonings in India. These incidents are often – but not exclusively – associated with methanol poisoning of the victims, where toxic methyl alcohol is used as a cheap way, as compared to the proper use of ethanol, to increase the alcohol content of moonshine.

 1978 Dhanbad liquor tragedy
 1981 Karnataka alcohol poisonings
 1982 Vypeen alcohol poisonings
 1991 Delhi alcohol poisonings
 1992 Odisha liquor deaths
 2008 Karnataka-Tamil Nadu alcohol poisonings
 2009 Gujarat alcohol poisonings
 2011 Sangrampur methanol poisonings
 2011 Bengal alcohol poisonings
 2012 Odisha alcohol poisonings
 2013 Azamgarh alcohol poisonings
 2015 Bengal alcohol poisonings
 2015 Mumbai alcohol poisonings
 2016 Bihar alcohol poisonings
 2019 Assam alcohol poisonings
 2019 Uttar Pradesh - Uttarakhand alcohol poisoning
 2020 Punjab alcohol poisoning
 2022 Gujarat Toxic Liquor deaths
 2022 Bihar alcohol poisoning

See also
 Alcohol prohibition in India

Alcohol-related deaths in India
Alcohol poisonings
Methanol poisoning incidents